The Under Secretary of Commerce for Economic Affairs, or USC-EA, is a high-ranking official in the United States Department of Commerce that serves as the principal adviser to the United States Secretary of Commerce on economic analysis. The Under Secretary is ex officio the Administrator of the Economics and Statistics Administration.

The Under Secretary is appointed by the president of the United States and confirmed by the United States Senate to serve at the pleasure of the president. In October 2021, President Joe Biden nominated Jed Kolko to be Under Secretary. He was confirmed by the United States Senate on April 7, 2022, and sworn in on April 19.

Overview
The Under Secretary of Commerce for Economic Affairs oversees the Economics and Statistics Administration as that body's Administrator. As the principal element of the Commerce Department for economic affairs, the Under Secretary provides timely economic analysis and disseminates national economic indicators. The Under Secretary serves as the Department's representative to the president's Council of Economic Advisers, interagency panels on economic issues, and other government agencies concerned with economic matters. The Under Secretary's principal responsibilities include: economic forecasting, consultation with the private sector on economic and broad economic sectoral developments, and policy analysis and development in the areas of economic policy.

The Under Secretary oversees the United States Census Bureau and the Bureau of Economic Analysis. These two statistical agencies gather, calculate, and disseminate much demographic, social and economic data including reports on the nation's gross domestic product, retail sales, personal income, housing starts, inventory levels and international trade.

With the rank of Under Secretary, the USC(EA) is a Level III position within the Executive Schedule. Since January 2010, the annual rate of pay for Level III is $165,300.

History
The position was created by an Act of Congress on June 16, 1982. The Under Secretary for Economic Affairs is fourth in the line of succession for Secretary of Commerce.

List of officeholders

Reporting Officials
Officials reporting to the USC(EA) include:
Deputy Under Secretary of Commerce for Economic Affairs
Chief Economist
Director, Bureau of the Census
Director, Bureau of Economic Analysis
Associate Under Secretary of Commerce for Management
Associate Under Secretary of Commerce for Communications

References